Eric S. Bassler is an American politician and financial advisor serving as a member of the Indiana Senate from the 39th district. He assumed office on November 5, 2014.

Early life and education 
Bassler was born and raised in Washington, Indiana. He earned a Bachelor of Arts degree in chemistry and psychology and a Master of Arts degree in economics from Indiana University Bloomington.

Career 
Bassler began his career as a consultant on bank reform projects and was a Peace Corps volunteer in the Soviet Union, Albania, and Ukraine. He has since worked as a certified financial planner at an Edward Jones Investments office in Washington, Indiana.

Bassler was elected to the Indiana Senate in November 2014. In the 2019–2020 legislative session, Bassler served as chair of the Senate Insurance and Financial Institutions Committee. In the 2021–2022 session, he is the ranking member of the Senate Appropriations Committee. He is also chair of the Senate School Funding Subcommittee.

References 

Living people
People from Washington, Indiana
Republican Party Indiana state senators
Indiana University Bloomington alumni
Peace Corps volunteers
21st-century American politicians
Year of birth missing (living people)